Steve 'n' Seagulls is a Finnish country band, playing bluegrass versions of well-known hard rock and metal songs. The band became known in the summer of 2014 with the publication of videos on YouTube. Especially popular was the band's version of "Thunderstruck" by AC/DC, which has over 150 million views on YouTube. The band's debut album Farm Machine was released through Spinefarm Records on May 8, 2015. In November 2015, Steve 'n' Seagulls were featured on A.V. Undercover covering "Sabotage" by the Beastie Boys. On August 3, 2016 they released a cover of "Aces High" promoting their second album Brothers in Farms.

Band members 
Current members
 Remmel – vocals, acoustic guitar, balalaika, mandolin, anvil
 Herman – banjo, vocals, acoustic guitar
 Hiltunen – accordion, kantele, mandolin, keyboards, flute
 Jamppa – double bass, Fiddle vocals (2019–present)
 Skubu – drums, percussion, vocals (2019–present)
Former members
 Pukki – double bass, vocals (until May 2019)

Tarja turunen guest vocals in studio for sleeping sun 

 Puikkonen – drums, percussion, vocals (until August 2019)

Discography 
Albums
 Farm Machine (2015)
 Brothers in Farms (2016)
 Grainsville (2018)
 Another Miracle (2020)

Singles
 ”The Trooper” (2014)
 ”Holy Diver” (2014)
 ”Thunderstruck” (2014)
 ”You Shook Me All Night Long” (2015)
 ”Seek And Destroy” (2015)
 ”Run To The Hills” (2015)
 ”Nothing Else Matters” (2015)
 ”Cemetery Gates” (2015)
 ”Black Dog” (2016)
 ”Aces High” (2016)
 ”November Rain” (2016)
 ”Self Esteem” (2016)
 "It's a Long Way to the Top (If You Wanna Rock 'n' Roll)" (2017)
 ”You Could Be Mine” (2017)
 "Antisocial" (2017)

References

External links

 Official website
 Youtube channel
 VEVO channel
 
 

Cover bands
Finnish bluegrass music groups
Finnish musical groups